is a district of Minato, Tokyo, Japan. It consists of 1 to 3-chōme.

The Embassy of the Russian Federation in Japan as well as the Russian Embassy School in Tokyo are both located in Azabudai., as is the Embassy of Afghanistan.

Azabudai Hills is under construction, and its main building, Mori JP Tower is been constructed on the site of the Azabu Post Office.

Education

Minato City Board of Education operates public elementary and junior high schools.

Azabudai 1-chōme 1-10-ban, 2-chōme, and 3-chōme are zoned to Azabu Elementary School (麻布小学校) and Roppongi Junior High School (六本木中学校). Azabu-Jūban 1-chōme 11-ban is zoned to Onarimon Elementary School (御成門小学校) and Onarimon Junior High School (御成門中学校).

References

Districts of Minato, Tokyo